Seoane is a toponymic surname of Galician origin, meaning "Saint John". It may refer to:

Consuelo Seoane (1876–1964), colonel in the US Army (third cavalry)
Diego Seoane Pérez (born 1988), Spanish footballer
Fernando Seoane (born 1983), Spanish professional footballer
Gerardo Seoane (born 1978), Swiss footballer
Luís Seoane (1910–1979), lithographer and artist
Manny Seoane (born 1955), retired professional baseball player
Manuel Seoane (1902–1975), Argentine football striker
María Seoane (born 1948), Argentine journalist, writer, and film director
Mariana Seoane (born 1976), Mexican actress, model and singer

ca:Seoane